The 9th Asian Cross Country Championships took place on March 10, 2007, in Amman, Jordan. Team rankings were decided by a combination of each nation's top three athletes finishing positions.

Medalists

Medal table

References
Results

Asian Cross Country Championships
Asian Cross Country
Asian Cross Country
Asian Cross Country
Sports competitions in Amman
International athletics competitions hosted by Jordan